Russell Hamilton (born August 8, 1969), better known by his stage name "Russell", is an American singer-songwriter, record producer and entrepreneur. Russell is an R&B singer.  Russell's only album is titled When I'm With You, and featured a duet with R&B singer, R. Kelly. The song titled "Rich Man" reached No. 9 on the Billboard Hot R&B/Hip-Hop Songs chart.

References

1969 births
Living people
Record producers from Ohio
Musicians from Cleveland